Massimo Felisatti (12 May 1932 – 7 September 2016) was an Italian novelist, essayist, screenwriter, and director.

Biography 
Born in Ferrara, Felisatti graduated in Modern Letters, and then he started collaborating with some local newspapers, also  directing the cultural magazine Ferrara. In 1966 he moved to Rome, where he first worked as translator and essayist. In the 1970s he started a proficuous collaboration with the writer Fabio Pittorru, debuting with the successful giallo novel Violenza a Roma, and writing screenplays for numerous films and for the crime TV-series Qui squadra mobile.

Felisatti was also active as a film director, co-directing with Sergio Grieco the poliziottesco Terror in Rome (1976) and a segment of the anthology film Un altro mondo è possibile (2001).

Screenplays 
 
     Il primo premio si chiama Irene, directed by Renzo Ragazzi (1969)
     Blow Hot, Blow Cold, directed by Florestano Vancini (1970)
     The Weekend Murders, directed by  Michele Lupo (1970)
     Quando gli uomini armarono la clava e... con le donne fecero din don, directed by  Bruno Corbucci (1971)
     The Night Evelyn Came Out of the Grave, directed by  Emilio P. Miraglia (1971)
     Shadows Unseen, directed by  Camillo Bazzoni (1972)
     The Sicilian Checkmate, directed by Florestano Vancini (1972)
     The Body, directed by  Luigi Scattini (1974)
     Silent Action, directed by  Sergio Martino (1975)
     Calling All Police Cars, directed by  Mario Caiano (1975) 
     Nude per l'assassino, directed by  Andrea Bianchi (1975)
     Sexycop, directed by  Duccio Tessari (1975)
     Confessions of a Frustrated Housewife, directed by  Andrea Bianchi (1976) 
     Il disertore, directed by Giuliana Berlinguer (1983)
     La neve nel bicchiere, directed by  Florestano Vancini (1984) 
     Un uomo di razza, directed by  Bruno Rasia (1989)
     Sulla spiaggia e di là dal molo, directed by Giovanni Fago (1999)
     L'appuntamento, directed by Veronica Bilbao La Vieja (2002)
     Amorfù, directed by Emanuela Piovano (2003)
     Pontormo – Un amore eretico, directed by Giovanni Fago (2004)
     E ridendo l'uccise, directed by Florestano Vancini (2005)

Books  
 Violenza a Roma, with Fabio Pittorru. Milan, Garzanti, 1973.
 Gli strateghi di Yalta, with Fabio Pittorru. Milan, Fabbri, 1974.
 La Madama, with Fabio Pittorru. Milan, Garzanti, 1974.
 Un delitto della polizia?. Milan, Bompiani, 1975.
 La nipote scomoda, with Bruno Gambarotta. Milan, Mondadori, 1977.
 Per vincere ci vogliono i leoni. with Fabio Pittorru, Milan, Mondadori, 1977.
 Qui squadra mobile. Milan, Garzanti, 1978.
 Agave, with Andrea Santini. Milan, Rizzoli, 1981.
 Isabella d'Este. Milan, Bompiani, 1982.
 Storia di Ferrara, terra d'acqua e di cielo. Milan, Camunia, 1986.
 O dolce terra addio, with Marco Leto. Milan, Rizzoli, 1987.
 Baruffino buffone. Ferrara, Liberty House, 1991.
 Tutta per gli occhi, in Carlo Bassi et al., Ferrara 1492-1992. Ferrara, Corbo, 1992. pp. 294–295.
 Corso di sceneggiatura, with Lucio Battistrada. Milan, Sansoni, 1993.
 Rosso su nero. Milan, Mondadori, 1996.
 A teatro con gli Estensi. Ferrara, Corbo, 1999.
 Sette colli in nero, anthology of short stories edited by Gian Franco Orsi. Milan, Alacran, 2006.

References

External links  
  

1932 births
2016 deaths
People from Ferrara
20th-century Italian non-fiction writers
20th-century Italian male writers
Italian screenwriters
Italian novelists
Italian essayists
Male essayists
Italian film directors
Italian male screenwriters
Italian male non-fiction writers
20th-century Italian translators